Brooke-Hitching is a surname. Notable people with the surname include:

Thomas Brooke-Hitching (1858–1926), British businessman and politician
Edward Brooke-Hitching (fl. 2019), British writer and map-collector

Compound surnames